Fredonia is a home rule-class city in Caldwell County, Kentucky, in the United States. The population was 401 at the 2010 census.

Geography
Fredonia is located in western Caldwell County at  (37.209111, -88.058850). U.S. Route 641 passes through the city, leading north  to Marion and south  to Eddyville near Interstates 24 and 69. Ky. 91 connects Fredonia to the county seat of Princeton  to the southeast.

History
The town is said to have been laid out in 1836. The name "Fredonia" was a popular one in America in the early 19th century after its use was popularized by Samuel L. Mitchill of New York, but local tradition holds that the Kentucky town was named for the daughter of town founder Harvey W. Bigham. It was formally incorporated by the state assembly in 1869.

Demographics

As of the census of 2000, there were 420 people, 177 households, and 132 families residing in the city. The racial makeup of the city was 96.19% White, 3.57% African American, and 0.24% from two or more races. Hispanic or Latino of any race were 0.48% of the population.

There were 177 households, out of which 28.8% had children under the age of 18 living with them, 62.1% were married couples living together, 10.2% had a female householder with no husband present, and 25.4% were non-families. 24.9% of all households were made up of individuals, and 13.0% had someone living alone who was 65 years of age or older. The average household size was 2.37 and the average family size was 2.80.

In the city, the population was spread out, with 21.4% under the age of 18, 6.4% from 18 to 24, 31.2% from 25 to 44, 24.3% from 45 to 64, and 16.7% who were 65 years of age or older. The median age was 39 years. For every 100 females, there were 94.4 males. For every 100 females age 18 and over, there were 90.8 males.

The median income for a household in the city was $35,893, and the median income for a family was $41,250. Males had a median income of $35,000 versus $21,429 for females. The per capita income for the city was $14,865. About 9.2% of families and 13.0% of the population were below the poverty line, including 19.4% of those under age 18 and 9.7% of those age 65 or over.

References

Cities in Kentucky
Cities in Caldwell County, Kentucky